Culley Clyde Carson III (born 1945) is an American retired urologist who specializes in Peyronie's disease, penile implants and erectile dysfunction. After serving two years as a flight surgeon with the United States Air Force, he took on a urology residency at the Mayo Clinic and then taught at the Duke University Medical Center as an assistant professor, subsequently gaining full professorship.

He was later named John Sloan Rhodes and John Flint Rhodes Distinguished Professor within the Department of Urology at the University of North Carolina School of Medicine. Upon his retirement, he was granted emeritus status.

Education and career

Culley Clyde Carson III was born in February 1945 in Westerly, Rhode Island. After graduating from Trinity College in Connecticut, he studied at the George Washington University School of Medicine, where he received the Calvin Klopp Award for outstanding research. He then began his residency at Dartmouth Hitchcock Medical Center. Carson then served two years as a flight surgeon with the United States Air Force (USAF), after which he took on a urology residency and fellowship at the Mayo Clinic, Rochester Minnesota. Carson began his teaching career at the Duke University Medical Center, as an assistant professor. He was subsequently promoted to full professor, and left for the University of North Carolina School of Medicine, where he was later named John Sloan Rhodes and John Flint Rhodes Distinguished Professor within the Department of Urology. Carson was chief of the department between 1993 and 2010. Upon his retirement, he was granted emeritus status.

He has authored over 300 peer-reviewed articles and edited more than eight textbooks. He is the founding editor-in-chief of the Sexual Medicine Reviews journal and served through April 2014. Carson has been chief editor of Contemporary Urology and is an associate editor of Trends in Urology and Men's Health.

His research has focussed on erectile dysfunction, penile prostheses, and treatments for Peyronie's disease, where the penis curves upon erection.

In the third edition of his textbook Men's Health, ten years after the first edition. when he and his colleagues questioned why men die on average five years earlier than women, they attempt to address the gender gap and provide practical advice to general physicians and specialists.

Honors and awards
In 1974, he became United States Air Force Flight Surgeon of the Year. In 2000, he was awarded the Royal Society of Medicine's book prize for his textbook Erectile Dysfunction, and in 2001 he won the Jesse H. Neal Award for editorial writing.

In 2011 Carson was awarded the Distinguished Contributor Award by the American Urological Association, of which he has been an active member, and the following year received their Brantley Scott Award.

He is a fellow of the Sexual Medicine Society of North America and was their past president in 2003. In 2014, he received their Lifetime Achievement Award and in the same year, he was awarded the St. Paul's Medal from the Council of the British Association of Urological Surgeons. In 2015, the Massachusetts Medical Society awarded Carson its Men's Health Award. He has also held presidencies of the Society of University Urologists and the American Society for Men's Health.

Selected publications

Books
Endourology. Churchill Livingstone (1985). . With N. Reed Dunnick
Textbook of Erectile Dysfunction. Taylor & Francis (1999). With Irwin Goldstein and Roger S. Kirby
Urologic Prostheses: The Complete Practical Guide to Devices, Their Implantation and Patient Follow Up. Springer Science + Business Media (2002). 
Key Clinical Trials in Erectile Dysfunction. Springer (2007). .
Management of Erectile Dysfunction in Clinical Practice. Springer (2007). 
Men's Health. Routledge, London (2009). (3rd Edition). . Co-edited with Roger Kirby, Michael Kirby and Adrian White

Articles
Surgery for "Stuttering Priapism". The Journal of Urology. Vol. 181, Issue 2 (1 February 2009), pages 449-450. 
"Surgical Techniques: Penile Prosthesis for Cylinder Tip Malposition". The Journal of Sexual Medicine. Volume 6, Issue 9 (September 2009). 
"Government Regulation Can Be Helpful". Sexual Medicine Reviews. Volume 2, Issue 2 (April 2014), pages 57-58.  
"Outcomes of surgical treatment of Peyronie's disease". British Journal of Urology International. Volume 113, Number 5 (May 2014)), pages 704-13. Co-authored with L. A. Levine. .
"Analysis of the clinical safety of intralesional injection of collagenase Clostridium histolyticum (CCH) for adults with Peyronie's disease (PD).". British Journal of Urology International. Volume 116, Number 5 (November 2015), pp. 815-822. . (Carson et al.)

References

External links
Curriculum vitae: Culley C. Carson III.  
Peyronie’s disease: a less known issue of erectile dysfunction. 2018

1945 births
Living people
American urologists
George Washington University School of Medicine & Health Sciences alumni
University of North Carolina School of Medicine faculty
Duke University School of Medicine faculty
United States Air Force Medical Corps officers
20th-century American physicians
21st-century American physicians
Trinity College (Connecticut) alumni
Academic journal editors
Physicians from Rhode Island
People from Westerly, Rhode Island
Military personnel from Rhode Island